Edwardsville may refer to:

Canada 
 Edwardsville, Nova Scotia

United Kingdom 
Edwardsville, Merthyr Tydfil

United States 
Edwardsville, Alabama
Edwardsville, Illinois
Edwardsville, Indiana
Edwardsville, Kansas
Edwardsville, Ohio
Edwardsville, Pennsylvania